Martha M. Place (September 18, 1849 – March 20, 1899) was an American murderer and the first woman to die in the electric chair. She was executed on March 20, 1899, at Sing Sing Correctional Facility for the murder of her stepdaughter Ida Place.

Background
Martha Place was born Martha "Mattie" Garretson on September 18, 1849, in Readington Township, New Jersey, to Ellen (née Wyckoff) and Isaac V. N. Garretson. Place was struck in the head by a sleigh at age 23; her brother claimed that she never completely recovered and that the accident left her mentally unstable. Place lived in New Jersey and worked as a dressmaker. She married a man named Wesley Savacool, but she abandoned him after giving birth to their son, Ross Savacool. Wesley left when Ross was three, and facing hardship, Martha gave Ross up for adoption, going to the Ashenbach family of Newark who had recently lost a son. They renamed him William.

In 1893 Martha relocated to New York and went to work as a housekeeper for a man named William W. Place, at 598 Hancock Street in Brooklyn. She married him later that year. After the marriage Martha asked that they get another housekeeper: Hilda Jans.

Place had a daughter named Ida from a previous marriage. William married Martha to help him raise his daughter, although it was later rumored that Martha was jealous of Ida. William called the police at least once after his wife threatened to kill Ida.

Murder
On the evening of February 7, 1898, William Place arrived at his Brooklyn, New York, home and was attacked by Martha, who was wielding an axe. William escaped and ran for help. When the police arrived, they found Martha Place in critical condition. She was lying on the floor with clothes over her head and gas from burners was escaping into the room. Upstairs they discovered the body of 17-year-old Ida Place lying on a bed, blood coming from her mouth. William was an amateur photographer, which involved the use of acid, and the murderer had thrown this acid in Ida's eyes. The evidence later indicated Ida Place died from asphyxiation. Martha Place was hospitalized and arrested.

Trial
Place proclaimed her innocence while awaiting trial. One contemporary newspaper report described the defendant in this way:

Martha Place was found guilty of the murder of her stepdaughter Ida and sentenced to death.  Her husband was a key witness against her.

Execution
The governor of the state of New York, Theodore Roosevelt, was asked to commute Place's death sentence, but he refused. Having never executed a woman in the electric chair, those responsible for carrying out the death warrant devised a new way to place the electrodes upon her, deciding to slit her dress and place the electrode on her ankle. Edwin F. Davis was the executioner. According to the reports of witnesses, she died instantly.

Martha Place was buried in the family cemetery plot in East Millstone, New Jersey, without religious observances.

Although Place was the first woman to die in the electric chair, she was the third to be sentenced to die by this method, the first two being serial killer Lizzie Halliday (1894 conviction commuted and sent to an asylum) and Maria Barbella (sentenced in 1895 and acquitted the next year).

See also

Capital punishment in New York
List of people executed in New York

References

Further reading

Wasserman, Marlie Parker, The Murderess Must Die, Level Best Books, 2021

External links

1849 births
1898 crimes in the United States
1899 deaths
19th-century American criminals
19th-century American women
19th-century executions by New York (state)
19th-century executions by the United States
19th-century executions of American people
American female criminals
American female murderers
American murderers
American murderers of children
American people convicted of murder
Burials in New Jersey
Executed American women
Executed people from New Jersey
People convicted of murder by New York (state)
People executed for murder
People executed by New York (state) by electric chair
People from Readington Township, New Jersey